Truus is a feminine Dutch given name, often a shortened hypocorism of Geertruida. Notable people with the name include:

Truus van Aalten (1910–1999), Dutch actress
Truus Bauer (1945–1989), Dutch rower
Truus Baumeister (1907–2000) Dutch swimmer
Truus Hennipman, (born 1943), Dutch sprinter
Truus Kerkmeester (1921–1990), Dutch swimmer
Truus Klapwijk (1904–1991), Dutch diver and swimmer
Truus Looijs (born 1946), Dutch swimmer
Truus Menger-Oversteegen (1923–2016), Dutch sculptor and painter
Truus van der Plaat, Dutch track and road cyclist 
Truus Schröder-Schräder (1889–1985), Dutch socialite and trained pharmacist
Geertruida Wijsmuller-Meijer (1896–1978) (Truus Wijsmuller-Meijer) Dutch war hero, resistance fighter 

Dutch feminine given names